Hürriyet (Turkish for liberty) may refer to:

People
 Hürriyet (name), list of people with the name

Places
 Hürriyet, Fındıklı, district in Rize, Turkey
 Hürriyet Island, island located in Muğla Province, Turkey
 Hürriyet, Karacabey, village in the Karacabey district of Bursa Province

Publications
 Hürriyet, Turkish newspaper founded in 1948
 Hürriyet Daily News, Turkish newspaper published in English language, founded in 1961

Other uses
 Hürriyet ve İtilâf Fırkası, political party in the Ottoman Empire
 Vatan ve Hürriyet, secret revolutionary society opposed to Ottoman Sultan Abdul Hamid II